The 1999 FIVB Men's World Cup was held from 18 November to 2 December 1999 in Japan. Twelve men's national teams played in cities all over Japan for the right to a fast lane ticket into the 2000 Summer Olympics in Sydney, Australia.

The twelve competing teams played a single-round robin format, in two parallel pools (site A and site B). The men played in Tokyo, Kagoshima, Hiroshima, Kumamoto, Osaka, Nagoya, Yoyogi, and Komazawa.

Qualification

Results

|}

All times are Japan Standard Time (UTC+09:00).

First round

Site A
Venue: Yoyogi National Stadium, Tokyo

|}

Site B
Venue: Kagoshima Arena, Kagoshima

|}

Second round

Site A
Location: Hiroshima

|}

Site B
Venue: Kumamoto Prefectural Gymnasium, Kumamoto

|}

Third round

Site A
Venue: Osaka Municipal Central Gymnasium, Osaka

|}

Site B
Venue: Nagoya Rainbow Hall, Nagoya

|}

Fourth round

Site A
Venue: Yoyogi National Stadium, Tokyo

|}

Site B
Venue: Komazawa Gymnasium, Tokyo

|}

Final standing

Awards

 Most Valuable Player
  Roman Yakovlev
 Best Scorer
  Rafael Pascual
 Best Spiker
  Roman Yakovlev
 Best Blocker
  Bang Sin-bong

 Best Server
  Osvaldo Hernández
 Best Digger
  Lee Ho
 Best Setter
  Lloy Ball
 Best Receiver
  Lee Ho

References

1999 Men's
W
V
V